Greeley County may refer to:
 Greeley County, Kansas
 Greeley County, Nebraska